Filbertone is the principal flavor compound of hazelnuts.  It is used in perfumery and is designated as generally recognized as safe (GRAS) for use in foods.

Because filbertone is found in hazelnut oil, its presence can be used to detect the adulteration of olive oil with less expensive hazelnut oil.

The natural compound is mixture of both enantiomers, and the composition can vary depending on the source.

See also
 2-Octanone
 3-Octanone

References

External links
 Filbertone, Molecule of the Month, University of Bristol

Enones
Flavors
Perfume ingredients